Tappeh Bur may refer to:
 Tappeh Bur, Kermanshah
 Tappeh Bur, West Azerbaijan